Prisoner of Paradise (also known as Nazi Love Island) is a 1980 American pornographic exploitation film directed by Gail Palmer and Bob Chinn. The film takes place during World War II, and stars John C. Holmes as Joe Murrey, a shipwrecked sailor who comes to the rescue of two American nurses who are being held captive by a Nazi officer and his three assistants on an island in the South Pacific. The other members of the cast include Seka, Elmo Lavino, Sue Carol, Jade Wong, and Nikki Anderson. The film was released in the United States in 1980, and received an X rating from the Motion Picture Association of America.

The film has been classified as an example of Nazisploitation, a subgenre of exploitation and sexploitation films in which Nazi characters are prominent.

Cast
 John C. Holmes as Joe Murrey
 Seka as Ilsa
 Elmo Lavino as Hans (as Heinz Mueller)
 Sue Carol as Greta
 Jade Wong as Suke
 Nikki Anderson as Carol (as Nicki Anderson)
 Brenda Vargo as Gloria
 Mai Lin as Sue Lee (as Miko Moto)

Critical reception
A reviewer in Cinema Retro wrote: "What sets Prisoner of Paradise apart from most of the porn drivel of this era is the better-than-average direction coupled with a relatively lavish budget. There are some impressive special effects in the finale and the directors even manage to squeeze in an original love song". Brian Orndorf of Blu-ray.com called the film "an uncomfortable mix of tonal speeds", and criticized it for "trying to pass itself off as reflective cinema when it should be focusing exclusively on salacious encounters."

Home media
The film was released on DVD and Blu-ray by Vinegar Syndrome.

References

External links
 

1980s exploitation films
1980s pornographic films
American sexploitation films
Nazi exploitation films
Films set on uninhabited islands
Films about Nazis
Films set in Oceania
American World War II films
Films directed by Bob Chinn
1980s English-language films
1980s American films